Old Dogs & New Tricks is a web series created by Leon Acord, and starring Acord, Curt Bonnem, David Pevsner and Jeffrey Patrick Olson. The comedy-drama series is about four middle-aged gay men living in "youth-obsessed West Hollywood".

Cast
Leon Acord stars as Nathan Adler, a 50-year-old gay talent agent whose closest friends include: Brad King (Curt Bonnem), who was a "one-hit wonder" in the late 1980s; Ross Stein (David Pevsner), a former TV leading man in the 1990s; and Al "Muscles" Carter (Jeffrey Patrick Olson), a personal trainer.

Old Dogs & New Tricks has featured guest stars including Greg Louganis, Thom Bierdz, Terri Garber, Ian Buchanan, Patrick Bristow, Rutanya Alda, Kathryn Leigh Scott, Gloria Gifford and Michael Kearns.

Broadcast
The series premiered in January 2012 on YouTube. It was later released on DVD by Wolfe Video, and then made available on Hulu in December 2013.

The first season consists of five episodes, the second season is ten episodes, and the third season is eight episodes plus a special, "WeHo Horror Story". A 2015 Indiegogo online fundraiser secured enough to fund a "4th & Final Season", scheduled for release in 2016.

References

External links
 

2010s American LGBT-related comedy television series
2012 web series debuts
American drama web series
LGBT-related mass media in the United States
American LGBT-related web series
Television shows set in Los Angeles